Fung Nin is one of the 39 constituencies in the Yuen Long District of Hong Kong.

The constituency returns one district councillor to the Yuen Long District Council, with an election every four years. Fung Nin constituency is loosely based on Chi King House, Crystal Park, Ho Shun Tai Building, Manhattan Plaza, Po Shing Building, Tsing Yu Terrace, and Yee Fung Garden with an estimated population of 19,006.

Councillors represented

Election results

2010s

References

Yuen Long
Constituencies of Hong Kong
Constituencies of Yuen Long District Council
1994 establishments in Hong Kong
Constituencies established in 1994